Stefano is the Italian form of the masculine given name Στέφανος (Stefanos, Stephen). The name is of Greek origin, Στέφανος, meaning a person who made a significant achievement and has been crowned. In Orthodox Christianity the achievement is in the realm of virtues, αρετές, therefore the name signifies a person who had triumphed over passions and gained the relevant virtues. In Italian, the stress falls usually on the first syllable,  (an exception is the Apulian surname Stefano); in English it is often mistakenly placed on the second, .

People with the given name Stefano

 Stefano (wrestler), ring name of Daniel Garcia Soto, professional wrestler
 Stefano Borgia (1731–1804), Italian Cardinal, theologian, antiquarian, and historian
 Stefano Bertacco (1962–2020), Italian politician
 Stefano Bloch (born 1976), American author and professor 
 Stefano Cagol (born 1969), Italian artist
 Stefano Casiraghi (1960–1990), Italian socialite
 Stefano Cavazzoni (1881–1951), Italian politician 
 Stefano Erardi (1630–1716), Maltese painter
 Stefano Garris (born 1979), German basketball player
 Stefano Gualeni (born 1978), Italian game-designer
 Stefano Guazzo (1530–1593), Italian writer
 Stefano Langone (born 1989), singer, American Idol contestant, now known simply as Stefano
 Stefano Lilipaly (born 1990), Dutch-Indonesia footballer
 Stefano Lusignan (1537–1590), writer and Catholic priest
 Stefano Mei (born 1963), Italian long-distance runner 
 Stefano Mori (born 1985), Filipino-Italian actor and singer
 Stefano Petitti (born 1953), Italian judge
 Stefano Pilati (born 1965), Italian fashion designer
 Stefano Pioli (born 1965), Italian footballer manager
 Stefano Podestà (born 1939), Italian academic and politician
 Stefano Righi (born 1960), Italian singer, songwriter, musician, record producer and actor
 Stefano Rosselli del Turco (1877–1947), Italian chess player
 Stefano Sensi (born 1995), Italian footballer
 Stefano Siglienti (1898–1971), Italian banker and politician 
 Stefano Sturaro (born 1993), Italian footballer
 Stefano Trespidi (born 1970), Italian opera stage director
 Stefano Vukov (born 1987), Croatian tennis coach

Middle name
 Antonio Stefano Benni (1880–1945), Italian entrepreneur and politician

Fictional characters
 Stefano DiMera, the main villain in Days of Our Lives
 Stefano, the Italian sea lion in the 2012 comedy film Madagascar 3: Europe's Most Wanted
 Stefano Valentini, major antagonist in The Evil Within 2

People with the surname Stefano
 Dario Stefano (born 1963), Italian politician
 Ippazio Stefano (born 1945), Italian politician
 Joey Stefano, stage name of American pornographic actor (a.k.a. Tony Stefano, 1968–1994), Nicholas Iacona Jr.
 Joseph Stefano (1922–2006), American screenwriter

See also
 San Stefano
 Santo Stefano (disambiguation)
 Stephan (given name)
 Stephano (disambiguation)
 Stephen
 Stefanoni
 Distefano
 Di Stefano

References

Given names
Surnames
Italian masculine given names
Italian-language surnames
Surnames of Italian origin
Sammarinese given names